State Highway 42 (SH 42) is a State Highway in Kerala, India, that starts in Kumarakom and ends in Cumbum. The highway is approximately 190 km long.

Route 
Kumarakom Boatjetti jn. – Edayazham – Kallara – Kaduthuruthy - kuruppanthara – Neezhoor - Elanji– Piravom Vazhithala – Karimkunnam – Velliyamattom – Kulamavu – Painavu  – Rajamudy – Thopramkudy - Prakash - Ezukuvayal - Kallar - Nedumkandam Cumbammettu – Cumbum

See also 
Roads in Kerala
List of State Highways in Kerala

References 

State Highways in Kerala
Roads in Kottayam district
Roads in Kasaragod district
Roads in Idukki district